"Hey Ma" is the second single released from American rapper Cam'ron's third album Come Home with Me. The song featured Juelz Santana, Freekey Zekey and Toya, and was produced by DR Period and Mafia Boy, who used a sample of The Commodores' 1977 hit, "Easy."

Released as the follow-up to Cam'ron's successful single "Oh Boy," "Hey Ma" followed that song's success, peaking at No. 3 on the Billboard Hot 100, his highest peak on that chart, while also reaching the top 10 on several other Billboard charts.

The remix also features Juelz Santana and Toya. This remix, produced by DR Period and Mafia Boy, was released on The Diplomats' first album, Diplomatic Immunity.

In popular culture
The song was featured in the 2012 film End of Watch. The song can also be heard in "Lord of the Bling", an episode of the television series Veronica Mars.

It was on MTV Classic's Total Request Playlist and House of Pop.

Music video 

The music video for the song was filmed at the Love Nightclub in Washington, D.C. in July 2002, and depicts the members of The Diplomats inside the club except for Juelz Santana, who is refused entry as the bouncer (played by then Love part-owner Taz Wube) thinks he looks too young to drink. Juelz then sets up his own party outside, and the rest of the club joins him. The video features cameo appearances from Jim Jones, Kareem "Biggs" Burke, and Damon Dash, as well as fellow Roc-A-Fella Records artists Beanie Sigel, Omillio Sparks, Oschino Vasquez, Young Gunz, and Freeway.

Charts

Weekly charts

Year-end charts

Certifications

References

2002 songs
Cam'ron songs
Juelz Santana songs
Roc-A-Fella Records singles
Songs written by Juelz Santana
Songs written by Cam'ron
Toya (singer) songs
Songs written by Lionel Richie